, who is also known as Matsutani Shōun, was a Japanese print designer, painter, and illustrator.  He was born in the city of Kōchi in Kōchi Prefecture, into a family of retainers of the shōgun and was given the name Mosaburō.  As a teenager, he studied Kanō-school painting with Yanagimoto Doso and Kawada Shoryu.  At about age 17, he moved to Tokyo, where he studied Nanga painting with Taki Katei.  At 20 years of age, he was employed as an illustrator for Fugoku gaho, a pictorial magazine dealing with the sights in and around Tokyo.  In his latter career, Shōun primarily produced paintings.  He died in 1965, at the age of 96.

In addition to his magazine illustrations, Shōun is best known for his woodblock prints of beautiful women and a group of humorous shikishiban (prints about 7 by 8 inches).  Shōun is considered a bridge between ukiyo-e and shin-hanga.  His career spans the Meiji (1868–1912), Taishō (1912–1926) and Shōwa (1926–1989) periods.

Yamamoto Shōun signed most of his works with a very small compact signature reading Shōun.

Gallery

References
 Gotō, Masako. Yamamoto Shōun: A View of Nostalgic Japan and the Beauties of those Days.  Kochi Shimbun, 2005.
 Masako, Gotō. Yamamoto Shōun, His Life and Works, Daruma Magazine, Issue 62, Spring 2009, pp. 36–51.
 Newland, Amy Reigle. (2005). Hotei Encyclopedia of Japanese Woodblock Prints.  Amsterdam: Hotei. ;  OCLC 61666175 

1870 births
1965 deaths
Ukiyo-e artists
Shin hanga artists
Japanese printmakers
20th-century Japanese painters
20th-century printmakers
People from Kōchi, Kōchi